This is a list of prominent people who were born in the town of South Kingstown, Rhode Island or who spent significant periods of their lives in the town.

Academia 

 Herman Churchill (1869–1941) – historian, college professor, and founder of the University of Rhode Island's history department
 T. Stephen Crawford (1900–1987) – chemical engineer and dean of the College of Engineering at the University of Rhode Island
 Caroline Hazard (1856–1945) – fifth president of Wellesley College
 William Metz (1914–2013) – historian and chairman of the University of Rhode Island's history department
 Roy G. Poulsen (1918–2006) – economist and director of the Research Center in Business and Economics at the University of Rhode Island
 Michael Rice (born 1955) – Chairman of the Department of Fisheries, Animal and Veterinary Science at the University of Rhode Island
 Hermann Viets (1943–2017) – astronautics engineer and president of the Milwaukee School of Engineering
 Homer Jay Wheeler (1861–1945) – chemist and director of the Rhode Island Agricultural Experiment Station at the University of Rhode Island

Activism, civil rights, and philanthropy 

 George Fayerweather (1802–1869) – abolitionist and blacksmith
 Sarah Harris Fayerweather (1812–1878) – abolitionist
 Edward Everett Hale (1822–1909) – religious leader and abolitionist
 Joe Patrick II (born 1963) – activist and retired Army soldier

Art, literature, and design 

 Jhumpa Lahiri (born 1967) – author
C. J. Chivers (born 1964) – author

Business 

 Augustus George Hazard (1802–1868) – businessman and gunpowder manufacturer
 Rowland Hazard III (1881–1945) – businessman and politician
 Rowland G. Hazard (1801–1888) – industrialist and politician

Crime 

 Michael Woodmansee (born 1958) – child murderer

Film, television, and stage 

 Andrew Burnap (born 1991) – actor
 Kate French (born 1984) – actress

Journalism 

 Bob Rathbun (born 1954) – sportscaster

Military 

 William J. Babcock (1841–1897) – Medal of Honor recipient
 David B. Champagne (1932–1952) – Medal of Honor recipient
 William G. Fournier (1913–1943) – Medal of Honor recipient
 Stephen Champlin (1789–1870) – Navy officer
 Christopher Raymond Perry (1761–1818) – Navy officer and Chief Justice of the Court of Common Pleas for Washington County
 Matthew C. Perry (1794–1858) – Navy officer
 Oliver Hazard Perry (1785–1819) – Navy officer
 Isaac P. Rodman (1822 – 1862) – Army officer and politician

Music 

 Aaron Rossi (born 1980) – drummer
 Erika Van Pelt (born 1985) – singer

Politics and government 

 Lemuel H. Arnold (1792–1852) – Governor of Rhode Island and U.S. Representative from Rhode Island
 James V. Aukerman (born 1948) – member of the Rhode Island House of Representatives
 George Brown (1746–1836) – Lieutenant Governor of Rhode Island
 Erasmus D. Campbell (1811–1873) – Governor of Wisconsin
 Kathleen Fogarty (born 1965) – member of the Rhode Island House of Representatives
 John Gardner (1747–1808) – delegate to the Congress of the Confederation from Rhode Island
 Walter Gray (born 1926) – member of the Rhode Island House of Representatives
 Grafton Kenyon (1882–1960) – member of the Rhode Island House of Representatives and Rhode Island Senate
 Carder Hazard (1734–1792) – Associate Justice of the Rhode Island Supreme Court
 George Hazard (1700–1738) – Deputy Governor of Colonial Rhode Island
 Edward Holland (1931 or 1932-2015) – Rhode Island Senator
 Robert Hazard (1702–1751) – Deputy Governor of Colonial Rhode Island
 Gilbert V. Indeglia (born 1941) – Associate Justice of the Rhode Island Supreme Court
 John Shanley Jr. (1944–2021) – member of the Rhode Island House of Representatives
 Henry Marchant (1741–1796) – Founding Father and Attorney General of Rhode Island
 Paul Mumford (1734–1805) – Lieutenant Governor of Rhode Island and Chief Justice of the Rhode Island Supreme Court
 Thomas Mumford (1625–1692) – settled South Kingstown and served as the first High Sheriff
 Nathaniel Niles (1741–1828) – U.S. Representative from Vermont
 Elisha R. Potter (1764–1835) – U.S. Representative from Rhode Island
 Elisha R. Potter Jr. (1811–1882) – U.S. Representative from Rhode Island
 Samuel J. Potter (1753–1804) – Lieutenant Governor of Rhode Island and U.S. Senator from Rhode Island
 William Robinson (1693–1751) – Deputy Governor of Colonial Rhode Island
 Rob Roy Rawlings (1920–2001) – member of the Rhode Island House of Representatives
 Roy Willard Rawlings (1883–1973) – Speaker of the Rhode Island House of Representatives
 V. Susan Sosnowski (born 1955) – Rhode Island Senator
 Teresa Tanzi (born 1971) – member of the Rhode Island House of Representatives
 Robert Tiernan (1929–2014) – U.S. Representative from Rhode Island
 Lucy Rawlings Tootell (1911–2010) – member of the Rhode Island House of Representatives

Science 

 John Barlow (1872–1944) – entomologist
 Dorothy Bliss (1916–1987) – carcinologist and president of the American Society of Zoologists
 Alexander M. Cruickshank (1919–2017) – chemist and director of the Gordon Research Conferences
 Silvester Gardiner (1708 – 1786) – physician
 W. George Parks (1904–1975) – chemist and director of the Gordon Research Conferences
 John Sieburth (1927–2006) – biologist
 Samuel Slocum (1792–1861) – inventor
 Clarence M. Tarzwell (1907–1993) – biologist
 Malford W. Thewlis (1889–1956) – physician
 Richard W. Traxler (1928–2010) – microbiologist

Sports

 William Beck (1929-2017) – U.S. Olympian (1952 and 1956)
 Bob Bellemore (born 1959) – ice hockey coach
 Harry P. Cross (1873–1955) – football player and coach
 Martha Fierro (born 1977) – chess grandmaster and vice president of FIDE
 Ron Locke (born 1942) – baseball player
 Sean Maloney (born 1971) – baseball player
 Fred Tootell (1902–1964) – U.S. Olympian (1924)

See also 

 List of University of Rhode Island people
 List of people from Rhode Island
 Hazard Family
 Perry Family

References 

South Kingstown
South Kingstown